Elmer Pillon is a Canadian professional vert skater. Pillon earned his professional status in 2002 with a Bronze medal. He also got a 12th place in the Pro Circuit in Los Angeles California in 2003. and was ranked number six in the world for Vert Skating in 2004 with 1161 points. Pillon has a degree in PTA and is currently working at his own Health Rehab located in Coral Springs, Florida.

Best Tricks Liu-kang Brainless 720, Frontside Bio 1080

Vert competitions 
2006 Action Sports World Tour, Richmond, VA - Vert: 8th
2003 MSS, Buffalo, NY - Vert: 5
2003 MSS, Milwaukee, WI - Vert: 13th
2002 ASA World Championships, Los Angeles, CA - Vert: 3rd

References

External links

espneventmedia.com
hi-ho.ne.jp
espneventmedia.com
newschoolers.com
freestylemtx.com
story
lgactionsports.com
asaskate.com

Vert skaters
1973 births
Living people
Sportspeople from Ontario
X Games athletes